Erkin Boydullayev (born 10 October 1984) is an Uzbekistan international footballer, who plays as a midfielder for Qizilqum Zarafshon.

Career statistics

International

As of match played 1 February 2013.

References

External links

1984 births
Living people
Uzbekistani footballers
Uzbekistan international footballers
Association football midfielders
FC Bunyodkor players
PFC Lokomotiv Tashkent players
FK Dinamo Samarqand players
FC Nasaf players
FC AGMK players
Uzbekistan Super League players